Airhill is an unincorporated community in Montgomery County, in the U.S. state of Ohio.

History
A post office called Air Hill was established in 1865, the name was changed to Airhill in 1895, and the post office closed in 1900. Besides the post office, Airhill had a railroad station.

References

Unincorporated communities in Montgomery County, Ohio
Unincorporated communities in Ohio